is a 1926 Japanese silent film directed by Teinosuke Kinugasa. Lost for 45 years until it was rediscovered by Kinugasa in his storehouse in 1971, the film is the product of an avant-garde group of artists in Japan known as the Shinkankakuha (or School of New Perceptions) who tried to overcome naturalistic representation.

Yasunari Kawabata, who would win the Nobel Prize for Literature in 1968, was credited on the film with the original story. He is often cited as the screenwriter, and a version of the scenario is printed in his complete works, but the scenario is now considered a collaboration between him, Kinugasa, Banko Sawada, and Minoru Inuzuka. Eiji Tsuburaya is credited as an assistant cameraman.

Plot

The film takes place in an asylum in the countryside. Amid a torrential rainstorm, a janitor wanders through the halls revealing the various patients with mental illnesses. The next day, a young woman arrives and is surprised to see her father, the janitor, working there. Her mother is an inmate in the asylum and had gone insane due to the cruelty of her husband, the janitor, when he was a sailor. The husband, feeling guilty, took a job at the asylum to care for her. The daughter announces that she is soon to marry a fine young man, but the janitor begins to worry due to the then-common belief that mental illness was inherited. If the young man's family were to learn of the mother's illness, the marriage might be called off.

At work the janitor's relationship with his wife, unknown to the asylum, interferes with his job. He gets into a fight with some male inmates when his wife is hit, and he is sternly scolded by the head doctor. These events cause the janitor to experience a number of fantasies, as he slowly loses control of the border between dreams and reality. He first has a daydream about winning a chest of drawers in a lottery that he could give to his daughter as part of her dowry. When his daughter comes to tell him that her marriage is in trouble, he thinks about taking his wife away from the asylum to hide her existence. He also fantasizes about killing the head doctor, but the vision gets out of hand as a bearded inmate is seen marrying his daughter. The janitor finally dreams of distributing masks to the inmates, providing them with happy faces. He returns to work mopping the floors, no longer able to visit his wife's ward because he lost the keys (picked up by the doctor). He sees the bearded inmate pass by, who bows to him for the first time, as if bowing to his father-in-law.

Cast

Release

Initial release
A Page of Madness was first screened in Tokyo on 10 July 1926. Screenings would have included live narration by a storyteller or benshi as well as musical accompaniment. The famous benshi Musei Tokugawa narrated the film at the Musashinokan theater in Shinjuku in Tokyo.

21st-century screenings
The film was screened at the 2018 Ebertfest, on 20 April. It has also screened at the Lincoln Center in New York City featuring a live accompaniment with the Alloy Orchestra and the Eastman Museum in Rochester, New York.

Reception

Modern assessments
Reception of A Page of Madness since its rediscovery has been mostly positive. Dennis Schwartz from Ozus' World Movie Reviews awarded the film a grade A, calling it "a vibrant and unsettling work of great emotional power". Time Out, praised the film, writing, "A Page of Madness remains one of the most radical and challenging Japanese movies ever seen here." Panos Kotzathanasis from Asian Movie Pulse.com called it "a masterpiece", praising the film's acting, music, and imagery. Jonathan Crow from Allmovie praised its  "eerie, painted sets", lighting, and editing, calling it "a striking exploration of the nature of madness". Nottingham Culture's BBC preview of the film called it, "a balletic musing on our subconscious nightmares, examining dream states in a way that is both beautiful and highly disturbing." Jonathan Rosenbaum of The Chicago Reader praised the film's expressionist style, imagery, and depictions of madness as being "both startling and mesmerizing".

It was later included at number 50 in Slant Magazines "100 Best Horror Movies of All Time", citing the film's visuals and atmosphere as "lingering long after the film ends".

See also
List of rediscovered films

References

Sources

External links
 
 
 
 
A Page of Madness at SilentEra
A Page of Madness: The Lost, Avant Garde Masterpiece from Early Japanese Cinema (1926) in Film | January 17th, 2019
Midnight Eye Entry

1926 films
1926 horror films
1920s Japanese films
Japanese avant-garde and experimental films
Japanese black-and-white films
Japanese silent films
Japanese horror films
Films directed by Teinosuke Kinugasa
1920s rediscovered films
1920s avant-garde and experimental films
Rediscovered Japanese films